Hans Bergersen Wergeland (23 July 1861 – 8 July 1931) was a Norwegian politician.

He was born in Masfjorden, and worked as a farmer from 1885. He was mayor of his municipality for some time, and also chaired the boards of the local savings bank and the local shipping company.

He was elected to the Norwegian Parliament in 1907, for the Coalition Party, and in 1910 for the Conservative Party. He represented the constituency Nordhordland.

References

1861 births
1931 deaths
Members of the Storting
Coalition Party (Norway) politicians
Conservative Party (Norway) politicians
Mayors of places in Hordaland
People from Masfjorden